American Roll-on Roll-off Carrier is an American shipping line specialized in Roll-on/roll-off worldwide sea carriage.

Overview
ARC is the largest US-flag Roll-on/roll-off carrier, and the third largest US-flag shipping line overall
operating in international trade.

The company was founded in 1990, with headquartered in Ponte Vedra Beach, Florida and it is part of Wilh. Wilhelmsen group, along with Wallenius Wilhelmsen Logistics, EUKOR and United European Car Carriers.
The company's tonnage results composed of 8 US flagged ships.

All ARC vessels participate in the Maritime Security Program (MSP) and Voluntary Intermodal Sealift Agreement (VISA),
providing to the US armed forces sea transportation from and to the US and Europe when the space on board is not utilized by commercial cargo.

The company specializes in maritime transport and distribution of cargo such as automobiles, trucks, trailers, Mafi roll trailers, heavy construction machineries and further types of rolling freight, including military vehicles.

The main trade lanes are United States to Europe and Europe to the United States, specifically scheduling the Northern European ports of Antwerp, Bremerhaven, Southampton, and the US East coast ports of Baltimore, Charleston, Brunswick, Galveston.

Facts and accidents
On 2 June 2015, a fire started on board of ARC owned mv Courage. The vessel was sailing from Bremerhaven to Southampton when the flames broke out in the cargo hold, damaging vehicles and structure. The crew was able to contain the fire while at anchor, about 40 nautical miles from Southampton.

On 24 February 2017, ARC owned mv Honor faced an onboard fire in the English Channel while sailing in between the ports of Southampton and Baltimore.
The fire was kept under control by the 21 Crew members and was extinguished before the Coast Guard and fire brigades reached the vessel. The ship was then requested to proceed back into Southampton harbour for further inspection.

On 8 August 2018, a fuel spill happened near Port Arthur, Texas due to the collision of ARC owned mv Endurance against the Savage Pathfinder tugboat. 13,000 gallons of fuel were dispersed in the sea, however the spillage was secured and clean up started hours after the accident.

See also

EUKOR
Nippon Yusen Kaisha
Siem Shipping
KESS - K Line Europe Short Sea
United European Car Carriers

Gallery

References

Shipping companies of the United States
Ro-ro shipping companies
Car carrier shipping companies
Companies based in Morris County, New Jersey
Parsippany-Troy Hills, New Jersey
Transport companies established in 1990